The SNCF Class Y 9000 is the new designation for modernized and re-engined Y7100 and Y7400 shunters. The refurbishment was undertaken by a consortium consisting of SNCF, Socofer and Voith Turbo. Socofer refurbished 22 full locomotives at its Tours plant, and delivered 88 kits to SNCF's Sotteville-Quatre-Mares workshops. The first rebuilt locomotive was presented at InnoTrans 2010.

The first locomotives will be used by SNCF infrastructure division INFRA and will as such carry the grey-yellow INFRA livery. Later locomotives will be used by SNCF freight division FRET.

References

Y09000
B locomotives
Diesel locomotives of France
Railway locomotives introduced in 2010
Standard gauge locomotives of France
Diesel-hydraulic locomotives
Shunting locomotives